Nymphaeum or Nymphaion was a town on the eastern coast of ancient Bithynia located on the Black Sea, at a distance of 30 stadia west of the mouth of the Oxines, or 45 stadia from Tyndaridae.

Its site is unlocated.

References

Populated places in Bithynia
Former populated places in Turkey
Lost ancient cities and towns